The John I. Crawford Farm, also Hopewell Farm, is located on NY 302 in the Thompson Ridge section of the Town of Crawford in Orange County, New York, United States. It has been on the National Register of Historic Places since 1998.

Crawford, whose family lends its name to the town, settled the region and began building the farm around 1780. The property's main house was built not long afterwards, in the Federal style. A century later, in 1890, the bright yellow outbuildings of the property were updated in a Victorian style. The Crawford family cemetery lies to the southwest.

References

Houses on the National Register of Historic Places in New York (state)
National Register of Historic Places in Orange County, New York
Houses completed in 1780
Buildings and structures completed in 1890
Federal architecture in New York (state)
Victorian architecture in New York (state)